Bentz is a surname. Notable people with the surname include:

Alfred Bentz (1897–1964), German geologist
Chad Bentz (born 1980), American baseball player
Cliff Bentz (born 1952), American politician
Eddie Bentz (1894–1979), American criminal
Gunnar Bentz (born 1996), American swimmer
Melitta Bentz (1873–1950), German businesswoman and inventor
Misty C. Bentz (born 1980), American astrophysicist
Roman Bentz (1919–1996), American football player
Avery Bentz (born 1997), Canadian financial prodigy
David Bentz (born 1986), American politician
 Mark Bentz (born 1965), Canadian politician

German-language surnames

de:Bentz